Cy Thao (born March 2, 1972) is a Laotian-born Hmong American politician who served as a member of the Minnesota House of Representatives from 2003 to 2011.

Early life and education 
In 1975, Thao's family fled from Communists in Laos and lived in a refugee camp in Thailand until moving to the United States in 1980. Shortly thereafter, he joined the Boy Scouts of America and attained the rank of Eagle Scout. He credits Scouting with helping him blend into American society and teaching him the values of community obligation. Thao is a graduate of the University of Minnesota Morris (UMM).

Career 
A Democrat, Thao was first elected in 2002. He did not seek re-election in 2010, and left office on January 3, 2011. Thao represented District 65A, which includes portions of Saint Paul.

See also

 History of the Hmong in Minneapolis–Saint Paul

References

External links

Living people
1972 births
Politicians from Saint Paul, Minnesota
Artists from Saint Paul, Minnesota
University of Minnesota Morris alumni
Democratic Party members of the Minnesota House of Representatives
American politicians of Hmong descent
Asian-American people in Minnesota politics
21st-century American politicians